Red Family is a 2013 South Korean drama film directed by Lee Ju-hyoung. It was written, produced and co-edited by the renowned art house moviemaker Kim Ki-duk.

Plot summary
Undercover North Korean agents are planted in South Korean society with the mission to take out defectors.

Cast 
 Kim Yoo-mi as Baek Seung Hye
 Jung Woo as Kim Jae Hong
 Son Byong-ho as Jo Myung Shik
 Park So-yeong as Oh Min Ji
 Park Byung-eun as Chang-soo's father.
 Kang Eun-jin as Chang Soo's mother.
 Oh Jae-moo as Chang Soo

References

External links
 

South Korean drama films
2010s South Korean films